Nils Ole Nicklén (9 February 1917 – 9 May 1995)  was a Finnish high jumper.

He was born in Karis and represented a club in Helsinki, where he also died. He is best known for winning the bronze medal at the 1946 European Championships. At the 1948 Olympic Games he no-heighted in the final. His personal best jump was 2.00 metres, achieved in 1939.

References

1917 births
1995 deaths
People from Raseborg
Swedish-speaking Finns
Finnish male high jumpers
European Athletics Championships medalists
Athletes (track and field) at the 1948 Summer Olympics
Olympic athletes of Finland
Sportspeople from Uusimaa